Coleophora estriatella is a moth of the family Coleophoridae. It is found in China.

The wingspan is about 17.5 mm.

References

estriatella
Moths described in 1999
Moths of Asia